is an area of Koto, Tokyo, Japan. It is surrounded by water on all sides, but is joined by bridges to Shiomi to the north, Shin-Kiba and Yumenoshima to the east, and Shinonome to the west. The west side is largely residential, the east largely consists of parks. It is built on reclaimed land.

Etymology
The name "Tatsumi" means "South East", and is taken from the area's direction from the Tokyo Imperial Palace.

History

The swimming events for the 2020 Summer Olympics will be held in Tatsumi at the Tokyo Tatsumi International Swimming Center.

Transportation
 Tatsumi Station (Yurakucho Line)

Organizations
 Japanese Red Cross Tatsumi Building
 WOWOW Broadcasting Center

Public facilities

 Tokyo Tatsumi International Swimming Center
 Tatsumi Seaside Park
 Tatsumi No Mori Green Park

Schools
Koto Ward Board of Education operates public elementary and junior high schools.

Tatsumi Elementary School (辰巳小学校) and Number Two Tatsumi Elementary School (第二辰巳小学校) are zoned public elementary schools for different parts of Tatsumi. All of Tatsumi is zoned to Tatsumi Junior High School (辰巳中学校).

Schools in Tatsumi:
 Tatsumi Elementary School
 Number Two Tatsumi Elementary School 
 Tatsumi Junior High School

Residences
 Tatsumi 1-chome Apartments

References

External links
 Kōtō Ward official website 

Districts of Kōtō
Artificial islands of Tokyo